Territory located in present-day Benin.

Sources 
 Official website

See also 
Benin
Yoruba states
List of rulers of the Yoruba state of Dassa
List of rulers of the Yoruba state of Ketu
List of rulers of the Yoruba state of Oyo
List of rulers of the Yoruba state of Sabe
Lists of office-holders

Yoruba history
Benin history-related lists
Government of Benin
Lists of African rulers